Chocolate Weasel is a funk and hip-hop duo made up of T Power and Chris Stevens.

Discography
Spaghettification (1998) - Ninja Tune
"Music for Body Lockers" (1998) - Ninja Tune

References

Hip hop duos